Eric Kapaito Muugi (born 25 December 1995) is a Kenyan footballer who plays as a striker for Ethiopian Premier League club Arba Minch City and the Kenya national team.

Career
Born in Namanga, Kapaito spent his early career with Ligi Ndogo and Talanta. With Talanta he scored 15 times in the 2017 season. 

He signed Kariobangi Sharks for the 2018 season. He was the Kenyan Premier League top scorer and Most Valuable Player in both the 2018 and 2020–21 seasons.

He moved to Ethiopian club Arba Minch City in September 2021.

International career
He made his international debut for Kenya in 2018 against Comoros during an international friendly at the Stade de Marrakech in Morocco. His first international goal was against Tanzania at the Nyayo Stadium in March 2021.
Nyayo Stadium

Career statistics

International

International goals
 (scores and results list Kenya's goal tally first)

References

1995 births
Living people
Kenyan footballers
Kenya international footballers
Ligi Ndogo S.C. players
F.C. Talanta players
F.C. Kariobangi Sharks players
Arba Minch City F.C. players
Kenyan Premier League players
Association football forwards
Kenyan expatriate footballers
Kenyan expatriates in Ethiopia
Expatriate footballers in Ethiopia